The Girl (Swedish: Flickan) is a 2009 drama film from Sweden directed by Fredrik Edfeldt. It tells the story of a little girl (played by Blanca Engström) left alone at her home in 1981, while her parents and brother are on a trip to Sub-Saharan Africa to do charitable  work.

The film premiered at the 2009 Berlin International Film Festival. It won the 2010 Guldbagge Award for Best Cinematography.

References

External links
The Girl at The Swedish Film Database

2009 films
Swedish drama films
2000s Swedish films